Joseph J. Gushue was a highly respected referee in the American Basketball Association and the National Basketball Association (NBA).

Early life
Gushue was born in Port Richmond, Philadelphia and attended Northeast Catholic High School.

Career
Gushue worked as a carpenter and refereed community games before for being spotted by Sid Borgia, who saw him refereeing a summer league game while on vacation. He was invited to try out for the NBA in 1961.

In 1969, when the upstart American Basketball Association was raiding the NBA for talent, Gushue, along with three other top NBA "lead" referees—John Vanak, Earl Strom, and Norm Drucker—jumped to the ABA with multi-year contracts paying much higher salaries than NBA officials received. As a result, professional officiating salaries dramatically increased.

Gushue officiated in the 1965 NBA All-Star Game, 1969 NBA All-Star Game, 1971 ABA All-Star Game, 1977 NBA Finals, 1979 NBA Finals, 1980 NBA All-Star Game and 1980 NBA Finals.

Later life
Gushue retired from refereeing after the 1984 season and returned to his former profession as a union carpenter from UBC Local 1856.  He died on November 12, 1996, aged 64.

References 

American Basketball Association referees
National Basketball Association referees
1996 deaths
Year of birth missing